Farmington may refer to:

Places

Canada 
Farmington, British Columbia
Farmington, Nova Scotia (disambiguation)

United States
Farmington, Arkansas
Farmington, California
Farmington, Connecticut
Farmington, Delaware
Farmington, Georgia
Farmington, Kentucky
Farmington (Louisville, Kentucky), listed on the National Register of Historic Places in Jefferson County, Kentucky
Hustonville, Kentucky, formerly known as Farmington
Kingsley, Kentucky, formerly known as Farmington
Farmington, Illinois
Farmington, Indiana
Farmington, Iowa
Farmington, Maine, a New England town
Farmington (CDP), Maine, the main village in the town
Farmington, Michigan
Farmington, Minnesota
Farmington, Mississippi
Farmington, Missouri
Farmington, New Hampshire, a New England town
Farmington (CDP), New Hampshire, the main village in the town
Farmington, New Mexico
Farmington, New York
Farmington, North Carolina, a township and unincorporated community in Davie County, North Carolina
Farmington, Ohio
Farmington, Oregon
Farmington, Pennsylvania (Fayette County)
Farmington Township, Pennsylvania (disambiguation)
Farmington Township, Clarion County, Pennsylvania
Farmington Township, Tioga County, Pennsylvania
Farmington Township, Warren County, Pennsylvania
Farmington, Tennessee
Farmington, Utah
 Farmington (UTA station), Utah Transit Authority commuter rail station
Farmington, Virginia
Farmington (Hampton, Virginia), a neighborhood
Farmington (Albemarle County, Virginia), listed on the National Register of Historic Places in Albemarle County, Virginia
Farmington (St. Stephens Church, Virginia), listed on the National Register of Historic Places in King and Queen County, Virginia
Farmington, Washington
Farmington, West Virginia
Farmington, Wisconsin (disambiguation)
Farmington, Jefferson County, Wisconsin, a town
Farmington, La Crosse County, Wisconsin, a town
Farmington, Polk County, Wisconsin, a town
Farmington, Washington County, Wisconsin, a town
Farmington, Waupaca County, Wisconsin, a town
Farmington (community), Wisconsin, an unincorporated community
Farmington Canal,  also known as the New Haven and Northampton Canal, was a major private canal built in the early 19th century to provide water transportation from New Haven into the interior of Connecticut, Massachusetts and beyond
Farmington River, a river in Hartford County, Connecticut

Elsewhere
Farmington, Gloucestershire
Farmington River (Liberia), a river in Liberia

Other uses
 Farmington, nicknamed "The Farm", a fictional Los Angeles Police Department district in The Shield
Farmington Institute for Christian Studies, at Oxford, UK
University of Farmington, American fake university

See also
Battle of Farmington (disambiguation)
Farmington High School (disambiguation)
Farmington Public Schools (disambiguation)
Farmington Historic District (disambiguation)